The following is a list of prominent people who were born in or have lived in the Malaysian state of Terengganu, or for whom Terengganu is a significant part of their identity.

A
 Anuar Manan – cyclist, born in Kuala Terengganu
Azian Mazwan Sapuwan - Singer [] 
 Azizulhasni Awang - cyclist
 Aliaa Mansor - cyclist

B

C

D

E 
 Eman Manan - actor

F

G

H
 Hazman Al-Idrus - singer

I

J

K

L

M
 Mohammad Zuki Ali - Ketua Setiausaha Negara
 Muhammad Adam Danish Abdullah - footballer

N
 Nora Danish – actress, born in Kuala Terengganu

O

P

Q

R
 Rafizi Ramli – politician, born in Besut
Rozzi Panji - Drummer, Sessionist for concerts and recordings, Club Performer.

S
 Salleh Abas – Lord President of the Supreme Court, born in Besut

T

U

V

W

X

Y

Z
 Zoey Rahman - TV host
 Zizan Razak - actor

References

 
Terengganu